Acherensua is a town in the Ahafo Region of Ghana. The town is known for the Acherensua Secondary School.  The school is a second cycle institution.

Economy
Agricultural farming is the predominant work in Acherensua.
The major cash crops grown in this area are Cocoa and Rice
Foodstuffs such as Plantain and Cassava are also grown here.

References

Populated places in the Ahafo Region